Bending Bridges is a studio album by jazz guitarist Mary Halvorson, the second with her working quintet, composed of saxophonist Jon Irabagon, trumpeter Jonathan Finlayson, bassist John Hebert and drummer Ches Smith. It was released in May 2012 under Firehouse 12 Records.

Track list

References

External links
Bending Bridges by Mary Halvorson at iTunes.com
Bending Bridges at Firehouse 12 Records

2012 albums
Jazz albums by American artists